(1926 – November 23, 1984) was the first aikido master to live and teach in the west. He began training in Aikido in Osaka in 1942 and went on to train directly under the founder of the art Morihei Ueshiba at Iwama as an uchideshi during World War II. In 1952, after graduating in law from Waseda University, he moved to France where he studied law at the Sorbonne and  taught aikido as a 6th Dan representative of Aikikai Honbu.  After seven years he returned to Japan.  By 1964 he was a 7th dan black belt in aikido.

Aikido had been introduced into France a year earlier by Minoru Mochizuki during a visit, but it was Tadashi Abe's teaching at the judo dojo of Mikonosuke Kawaishi where aikido was first taught on a regular basis in the west.  

In his beginning years in aikido, Abe had been very keen on ascertaining the martial effectiveness of the art. He wrote two books on aikido in French language, and a scathing letter in critique of Koichi Tohei´s decision to break from the Aikikai and start his own Ki Society.  He was the cousin of Yoshimitsu Yamada.

References

External links
The Principle Disciples of Ueshiba Morihei
 Tadashi Abe Memorial site 

Japanese aikidoka
University of Paris alumni
Waseda University alumni
1926 births
1984 deaths
Japanese expatriates in France